Bard Rasun may refer to:
 Bard Rasun-e Olya
 Bard Rasun-e Sofla